Morgan Dennis (1892 – October 22, 1960) was an American illustrator and author known primarily for his paintings of dogs. He was born in Boston, Massachusetts and grew up in Long Island, New York. He studied art with William Harry Warren Bicknell. He was commissioned by the Black and White Scotch Whiskey Company to illustrate the "Black and White Scotties", a successful ad campaign used over many years. One of his murals, "The Dog House", is in the bar and lounge of the Sheraton Russell Hotel in New York. He also competed in art competitions at the 1936 Summer Olympics, but did not win a medal.

Bibliography 
Crazy Dog - 1944
Burlap (Houn' Dog Extraordinary) – 1945
The Dog Next Door – 1950
Himself and Burlap on TV – 1954
Kitten On The Keys – 1961
Lost Dog Jerry – 1952
The Morgan Dennis Dog Book (With Some Special Cats) – 1946
Pete (Airedale Terrier) – 1941
The Pup Himself – 1943
The Sea Dog – 1958
Skit And Skat – 1951
Every Dog Has His Say – 1947
"Pure Breeds" – 1954

References 

Morgan Dennis artwork can be viewed at American Art Archives web site
Morgan Dennis' profile at Sports Reference.com

External links 
 
 

1892 births
1960 deaths
American illustrators
Writers from Boston
People from Long Island
Olympic competitors in art competitions
20th-century American male writers